The cape of  is a nationally designated Place of Scenic Beauty located at the southeasternmost point of Miyako Island, Okinawa Prefecture, Japan. It is connected by a road No. 83. The promontory is 2 km long and 140 – 200 m wide.

At the end of the cape is a white lighthouse which gives 320° panorama view of the ocean, a very popular spot for sunrise viewing.  The lighthouse was erected in 1967 with assistance from the Japanese government after a man called Mr. Sunakawa, who was head of the local fishing union, had become concerned by several severe boating incidents near the coast of Higashi Hennazaki.

References

Headlands of Japan
Landforms of Okinawa Prefecture
Tourist attractions in Okinawa Prefecture
Places of Scenic Beauty